Arnold Milton Sowell (born April 6, 1935) is a former middle distance runner from the United States, who represented his native country at the 1956 Summer Olympics in Melbourne, Australia. He finished fourth in the Men's 800-meter race.

Life
The son of a Pittsburgh city council maintenance man, Sowell was a 1953 graduate of Schenley High School. As a student at the University of Pittsburgh, he became a prize-winning athlete while a member of the Pitt Panthers track and field team, taking the NCAA's 880-yard titles in 1954 and 1956. In 1956, he also won the annual Charles C. Hartwig award.

After leaving college with a business degree in 1957, he married fellow Pitt graduate, Barbara Peace, who had earned her degree in arts and sciences.

He then embarked on a career in the military. Sowell's admittance in 1957 to the Fort Benning United States Army Training School as a second lieutenant was viewed as newsworthy at the time. He continued his running career into 1959 as a representative of the army, and competed on the pentathlon team. In 1980, he retired at the rank of lieutenant colonel.

After the military, Sowell worked as a procurement director for the Charlotte (North Carolina) Housing Authority.

Legacy
Sowell has never been forgotten as a famous alumnus of Pitt and as a distinguished member of the African-American community. He has received accolades from the African American Alumni Council (AAAC) and the 1996 Award of Distinction by the Varsity Letter Club. In 2007, Sowell was one of the guests of honor at a celebration of fellow Olympian and Pitt alumnus Herb Douglas on his 85th birthday at a celebration at the Senator John Heinz History Center in Pittsburgh.

Athletic achievements
Sowell is best known for winning the gold medal in the men's 800-meter event during the 1955 Pan American Games in Mexico City. Sowell also set the world indoor record for the 880-yard run in 1957 at 1:50.3 and tied the world record for the 1,000 yards of 2:08.2 in 1955.

He was recognized as a very versatile and talented runner who could run a variety of distances, and even hurdle and long jump. 

One track coach, Manhattan's George Eastment, described him as the "greatest runner I ever saw";  another, Carl Olson, felt he could break the four-minute mile. 

During his career, he had a particular rivalry with his fellow countryman and middle-distance runner, Tom Courtney, the two swapping victories and being involved in many memorable duels. One duel was the 1956 Olympic trials where Courtney held off Sowell to finish first and second with Courtney in the process breaking Sowell's USA record (of 1:46.7) that he had achieved at that year's NCAA meet.

During the Olympic final itself, Sowell led from the back straight of the first lap right up to the final turn of the final lap where he was passed by Courtney. As they entered the final straight, Coutney now ahead had his own battle with Derek Johnson who had also passed Sowell, but Sowell now had to contend with the challenge of Audun Boysen. Courtney was to win his battle with Johnson and finish first, but Sowell lost his and finished fourth.

Sowell was an excellent runner indoors as well as outdoors, winning four NCAA titles and establishing a world record 1:50.3 for 880 yards.

In 1956, Sowell was a member of teams that set world records in the 4 x 440y and 4 x 880y relays.

Rankings 
Sowell was ranked among the best in the USA and the world at 800 metres/880 yards from 1954 to 1957, according to the votes of the experts of Track and Field News.

USA Championships

Sowell was a very successful competitor at 800 metres/880 yards at the USA National Track and Field Championships between 1955 and 1958.:

References

1935 births
Living people
American male middle-distance runners
Athletes (track and field) at the 1955 Pan American Games
Athletes (track and field) at the 1956 Summer Olympics
Olympic track and field athletes of the United States
University of Pittsburgh alumni
Pittsburgh Panthers men's track and field athletes
Sportspeople from Pittsburgh
Pan American Games gold medalists for the United States
Pan American Games medalists in athletics (track and field)
Medalists at the 1955 Pan American Games